Nkem-Nkum, or Isibiri, is an Ekoid language of Nigeria. There are two somewhat distinct dialects, Nkem (Nkim) and Nkum.

References

External links
Nkem-Nkum basic lexicon at the Global Lexicostatistical Database

Ekoid languages
Languages of Nigeria